An automobile or car is a kind of wheeled motor vehicle. 

Automobile may also refer to:

 Automobile (magazine), a magazine started in 1988
 The Automobile (magazine), the 1909–1917 name of the magazine Automotive Industries

See also

 Car (disambiguation)